Roll Over, Baby is the fifth studio album released by blues guitarist, Guitar Shorty. The album was recorded in April and May 1998 and released later that year in August on CD by Black Top.

Track listing 
"I Want to Report a Crime" (Williams) — 4:06
"Roll over, Baby" (Williams) — 4:48
"Sugar Wugar" (Kearney, Scott) — 4:46
"You're a Troublemaker" (Kearney, Scott) — 5:21
"Don't Mess With My Woman" (Kearney) — 4:36
"Me and You Last Night" (Williams) — 3:20
"Let's Get Close" (Kearney) — 3:10
"I Wonder Who's Sleeping in My Bed" (Kearney) — 7:04
"The Porkchop Song" (Williams) — 2:46
"I'm Going Back to Houston" (Kearney) — 4:16
"Hard Time Woman" (Alexander, Kearney) — 4:14
"Hey Joe" (Roberts) — 7:15

Personnel 
David Torkanowsky  — piano, organ (hammond)
Ernest Youngblood, Jr. — saxophone (tenor)
Guitar Shorty — guitar, vocals
Mark "Kaz" Kazanoff — saxophone (baritone, tenor)
Kenneth Blevins, Shannon Powell, Danny Pucillo Quartet — percussion, drums
Jamil Sharif, Gary Slechta — trumpets
Rick Trolsen — trombone
Lee Allen Zeno — bass, associate producer

Production:
David Farrell, Steve Reynolds — engineers, editing, mixing, sequencing
Blake Thompson — production assistant
Rick Olivier — photography
Hammond Scott — producer, editing, mixing, sequencing
Nauman S. Scott  — executive producer
Diane Wanek — design
Heather West — production coordination

Reception 

AllMusic says that "Guitar Shorty keeps it lean, mean and direct on this outing" and that the album "showcases the guitarist's wide-ranging chops and skills."

References 

1998 albums
Guitar Shorty albums